Chechu is a nickname used in Spanish-speaking countries, which may refer to:

 Francisco Javier Flores Gómez (born 1982), Spanish footballer
 Jesús Sánchez López (born 1996), Spanish footballer 
 José Francisco Rojo (born 1947), retired Spanish footballer and coach 
 María Cecilia Bonelli (born 1985), Argentine model
 José Luis Rubiera (born 1973), former Spanish professional road bicycle racer 
 José Antonio Dorado (born 1982), Spanish footballer 
 José Biriukov (born 1963), retired Spanish and Soviet basketball player